Paul Steven Shakes (born September 4, 1952) is a Canadian former professional ice hockey defenceman who played 21 games in the National Hockey League for the California Golden Seals during the 1973–74 season. The rest of his career, which lasted from 1972 to 1976, was spent in different minor leagues.

Career statistics

Regular season and playoffs

Awards & records
1972 OHA First All-Star Team

External links

1952 births
Living people
Canadian ice hockey defencemen
California Golden Seals draft picks
California Golden Seals players
Ice hockey people from Simcoe County
Salt Lake Golden Eagles (CHL) players
Salt Lake Golden Eagles (WHL) players
Sportspeople from Collingwood, Ontario
Springfield Indians players